Blaine Ferri (born September 29, 2000) is an American soccer player who plays as a midfielder for FC Tulsa in the USL Championship.

Career

Fort Lauderdale CF
Prior to the 2020 USL League One season, Ferri joined American club Fort Lauderdale CF on a free transfer. He made his league debut for the club on 18 July 2020, playing the entirety of a 2-0 home defeat to the Greenville Triumph.

North Texas SC
On June 18, 2021, Ferri signed with USL League One side North Texas SC. He debuted for the club the following day, appearing as a 71st-minute substitute during a 0–0 draw with FC Tucson.

FC Tulsa
On November 29, 2022, Ferri signed with USL Championship side FC Tulsa ahead of their 2023 season.

References

External links
Blaine Ferri at Sofa Score

2000 births
Living people
SpVgg Greuther Fürth II players
Inter Miami CF II players
North Texas SC players
Regionalliga players
USL League One players
American soccer players
United States men's youth international soccer players
Association football midfielders
American expatriate soccer players
American expatriate soccer players in Germany
Soccer players from Texas
MLS Next Pro players
FC Tulsa players